David Simpson (born 12 April 1965) is a former Australian rules footballer who played with Geelong in the Victorian Football League (VFL).

Simpson, who came to Geelong from Numurkah in the Murray Football League, appeared in the final three rounds of the 1984 VFL season. He was called up to make his debut, against Fitzroy, when Mark Yeates injured his hamstring in training and played at centre half-back on Garry Sidebottom. His other two games were against Richmond and Hawthorn.

References

1965 births
Australian rules footballers from Victoria (Australia)
Geelong Football Club players
Numurkah Football Club players
Living people